Alfred Duncan (8 January 1895 – 21 January 1975) was a New Zealand cricketer. He played in two first-class matches for Wellington in 1919/20.

See also
 List of Wellington representative cricketers

References

External links
 

1895 births
1975 deaths
New Zealand cricketers
Wellington cricketers
Cricketers from Wellington City